Diana Srebrovic (born 22 July 1984) is a Canadian former professional tennis player.

Srebrovic has career-high WTA rankings of 270 in singles, achieved on 3 November 2003, and 307 in doubles, set on 21 July 2003. She has won 1 doubles titles on the ITF Women's Circuit. Her only WTA Tour main draw appearance came at the 2001 Challenge Bell, where she partnered Mélanie Marois in the doubles event.

She decided to follow the college route and played for the Florida Gators varsity tennis team from 2005 to 2007.

ITF finals

Singles (1 titles, 2 runner–ups)

Doubles (1 titles, 2 runner–ups)

References

External links
 
 

1984 births
Living people
Canadian female tennis players
Sportspeople from Oakville, Ontario
Canadian people of Serbian descent
Florida Gators women's tennis players
Racket sportspeople from Ontario